Michael or Mike Ahern may refer to:

Michael Ahern (Irish politician) (born 1949), Irish Fianna Fáil politician and minister
Mike Ahern (Australian politician) (born 1942), Australian National Party politician and former Premier of Queensland
Mick Ahern (1905–1946), Irish hurler

See also
Mick Aherne, Gaelic football and hurling
Mike Ahearn, former Kansas State football coach